Typhon is a character from Greek mythology who is the final son of Gaia.

Typhon may also refer to:

 Typhon (comics), a Marvel Comics character who was an enemy of Hercules
 Typhon (Final Fantasy), a recurring character in the Final Fantasy franchise
 Typhon (Re:Zero), a character in the light novel series Re:Zero − Starting Life in Another World
 Typhon Combat System,  a cancelled integrated weapons system developed by the United States Navy that used:
 RIM-50 Typhon, a long-range anti-aircraft guided missile to provide ship-based fleet air defense
 42355 Typhon, a minor planet
 Caudron Typhon, a 1930s French high-speed single-seat monoplane utility aircraft built by Caudron-Renault
 French destroyer Typhon, a 1925 Bourrasque-class destroyer
 TVR Typhon, a sports car
 USS Typhon (ARL-28), a 1945 United States Navy Achelous-class landing craft repair ship
 A miniature gaming set made by Alternative Armies
 An antagonist in several Gene Wolfe novels including The Book of the New Sun
 One of the Titans in the 2019 film  King of the Monsters

See also
 Typhoon (disambiguation)